Dix Township is one of twelve townships in Ford County, Illinois, USA.  As of the 2010 census, its population was 642 and it contained 284 housing units.

History
Dix Township was originally named Drummer Grove Township; on September 2, 1864 it was renamed named in honor of John Adams Dix.

Geography

Cities, towns, villages
 Elliott

Unincorporated towns
 Guthrie

Cemeteries
The township contains these three cemeteries: Blackford, Oregon, and Pontoppidan.

Major highways
  Illinois Route 9
  Illinois Route 54

Airports and landing strips
 Barnes Landing Strip
 Gibson City Municipal Airport

Demographics

School districts
 Gibson City-Melvin-Sibley Community Unit School District 5

Political districts
 Illinois' 15th congressional district
 State House District 105
 State Senate District 53

References
 
 United States Census Bureau 2007 TIGER/Line Shapefiles
 United States National Atlas

External links
 City-Data.com
 Illinois State Archives

Townships in Ford County, Illinois
Townships in Illinois